Kimaera is a Lebanese death metal band founded by vocalist and guitarist Jean-Pierre Haddad in 2000. The band's music combines oriental metal, doom metal and death metal influences, with gothic undertones resounding through melodic interludes of violins, pianos and occasional female vocals.

History

In March 2004, the band released God's Wrath, a self-produced single. The release got the attention of Stygian Crypt Productions, which in turn led to the band's release of their debut album Ebony Veiled. The album was released in February 2006 in Lebanon and on 20 April 2006 the album saw a worldwide release.

Kimaera is among the first wave of international metal bands originating from the Middle East, known in their homeland as the "Lebanese Ambassadors of Doom".

The band released its second full-length album Solitary Impact with Stygian Crypt Productions in July 2010, along with their first official music video "The Taste of Treason". Soon after, they successfully made their first European appearance at the 2010 Masters of Rock festival in the Czech Republic.

In 2013, Kimaera released their third album The Harbinger of Doom after inking a deal with the German label Eternal Sound Records. This was followed by a music video for the track "Ancient Serpents" from the album.

In 2017, the band released a single called "The Die Is Cast".

In 2020, prior to the infamous Beirut blast on the 4th of August of that year, the band released a cover song by famous Lebanese singer Majida Al-Roumi "Ya Beirut" which was controversial due to the growling vocals style of the band that was not welcomed by the singer Majida Al-Roumi.

In February 2022, Kimaera's lead singer Jean Pierre Haddad found dead in the bathroom of his residency in Egypt

Members 
 Jean-Pierre Haddad - guitars & vocals (deceased) 
 Charbel Abboud - keyboards & synthesizers
 Pierre Najm - lead guitars
 Patrick Estephan - drums
 Richard Basile - bass guitar

Discography

Studio albums 

 Ebony Veiled (2006)
 Solitary Impact (2010)
 The Harbinger of Doom (2013)
 Imperivm (2022)

Singles 

 "December Ends" (2011)
 "The Die Is Cast" (2017)
 "Force Divine | Vi Divina" (2020)
 "Ya Beirut" (2020)

References

External links 
 Official Website
 Official Bandcamp page
  Kimaera on Encyclopedia Metallum

Lebanese heavy metal musical groups
Death metal musical groups
Musical groups established in 2000